Kerry Ann Bayliss (born 19 June 1962), also known as Kerry Ann Lindsay, is an Australian former gymnast. She competed in five events at the 1980 Summer Olympics.

References

External links
 
 
 
 

1962 births
Living people
Australian female artistic gymnasts
Olympic gymnasts of Australia
Gymnasts at the 1980 Summer Olympics
Place of birth missing (living people)
20th-century Australian women